Benjamin Kaufman (March 10, 1894 – February 5, 1981) was a First Sergeant in the U.S. Army during World War I. He received the Medal of Honor and the Croix de Guerre for bravery in action in the Argonne Forest, France on October 4, 1918.

Biography
Kaufman was born in Buffalo, New York, but grew up in Brooklyn, where he lived at 2113 Pitkin Avenue, at the time of enlistment. His mother was Mrs. Anna Kaufman. He was attending Syracuse University when he had to respond to the call to arms and joined the Army in 1917. He was assigned to Company K, 308th Infantry, 77th Division.

Kaufman proved to be a hero almost as soon as he was in combat in France. He became blinded by a gas shell while aiding in the rescue of several of his men. Despite his refusal of medical help, doctors forced him to go to the hospital. Kaufman decided to go back to battle and borrowed a uniform and made his way back to his outfit. Kaufman was faced with a court martial but the charges were dropped.
Kaufman received awards for bravery from nine foreign governments. The United States awarded him the Medal of Honor on April 8, 1919.

During World War II, he was director of the War Manpower Commission in New Jersey. He was also a commander of the New Jersey Council of the Disabled American Veterans of the World War and a national vice commander of the National Legion of Valor.

He was the executive director of the Jewish War Veterans of the United States from 1945 to 1959 and a former national commander of the organization, and for nearly 10 years, he was the manager of the Trenton office of the State Employment Service.

Benjamin Kaufman died on February 5, 1981, at the Mercer Medical Center in Trenton at the age of 86. He was survived by his wife, the former Dorothy Finkle; a daughter, Rita DeVries; a sister, Jennie Edwards, and two grandchildren.

Medal of Honor Citation
Rank and organization: First Sergeant, United States Army, Company K, 308th Infantry, 77th Division.
Place and date: In the Forest of Argonne, France, October 4, 1918.
Entered service at: Brooklyn, New York
Born: March 10, 1894, Buffalo, New York
General Orders: War Department, General Orders No. 50 (April 12, 1919)

Citation:

He took out a patrol for the purpose of attacking an enemy machinegun which had checked the advance of his company. Before reaching the gun he became separated from his patrol and a machinegun bullet shattered his right arm. Without hesitation he advanced on the gun alone, throwing grenades with his left hand and charging with an empty pistol, taking one prisoner and scattering the crew, bringing the gun and prisoner back to the first-aid station.

Military Awards
Kaufman's military decorations and awards include:

See also

List of Medal of Honor recipients
List of Jewish Medal of Honor recipients
List of Medal of Honor recipients for World War I

Notes

References

External links
 

1894 births
1981 deaths
United States Army Medal of Honor recipients
United States Army non-commissioned officers
People from Brownsville, Brooklyn
Recipients of the Croix de Guerre 1914–1918 (France)
Jewish Medal of Honor recipients
World War I recipients of the Medal of Honor
United States Army personnel of World War I
20th-century American Jews
Military personnel from Buffalo, New York